Central Park was a baseball venue located in the Hill District of Pittsburgh, Pennsylvania from 1921–1925. The stadium was the first black-owned, controlled and managed baseball park in the city. 

The ballpark served as the home of the Pittsburgh Keystones of the Negro National League. Officially named Central Amusement Park, the field's construction was commissioned in 1920 by Keystones' owner Alexander M. Williams and was designed by the prominent African-American architect, Louis Arnett Stuart Bellinger, who would later design Greenlee Field for the Pittsburgh Crawfords.

The ballpark was on a block bounded by Humber Way (north/northwest, third base); buildings and Junilla Street (northeast/east, left field); Hallett Street (southeast/south, right field); and Chauncey Street (southwest/west, first base). Across Humber were buildings and then Wylie Avenue. Well south of Hallett was a larger thoroughfare named Centre Avenue. Newspapers often gave the location as Wylie, Chauncey and Centre.

After the Keystones folded after their 1922 season, Williams lost his savings, and by 1924 he had sold the park to Sell Hall. Central Park was sold again and turned into a “summer dancing pavilion.”

In 2012, Central Park was denied an historical marker by the Pennsylvania Historical and Museum Commission.  According to the Commission, the venue was seen as a local or regional interest rather than a national and the state already had several other markers commemorating the Negro leagues.

The ballpark site is now occupied by a public park.

References

Negro league baseball venues
Defunct baseball venues in the United States
Sports venues in Pittsburgh
Demolished sports venues in Pennsylvania
Baseball venues in Pennsylvania
Defunct sports venues in Pennsylvania
1920 establishments in Pennsylvania
Sports venues completed in 1920
1925 disestablishments in Pennsylvania
Sports venues demolished in 1925